Ten 13 is the twelfth solo studio album by American singer Sammy Hagar. The title is his date of birth (October 13). It was released on October 24, 2000 by Beyond Music.

Song information
"Tropic of Capricorn" has an instrumental bonus tacked on the end called "Maui Wowie".

Track listing

Personnel
Sammy Hagar: lead vocals, guitar
Victor Johnson: guitar
Jesse Harms: keyboards
Mona Gnader: bass guitar
David Lauser: drums

Additional personnel
Roy Rogers: slide guitar on "The Real Deal"

Live and Raw in Cabo
Ten 13 was sold with a different bonus disc at both Best Buy and Circuit City retail stores. The mini-CDs were recorded at the Riverport Amphitheater outside of St. Louis, Missouri, on July 21, 2000.

Best Buy disc
"Intro" - 0:25
"Three Lock Box" (Hagar) - 3:12
"Both Sides Now" (Hagar/Harms) - 3:44

Circuit City disc
"Intro" - 0:28
"Space Station #5" (Hagar/Jim Peterik) - 3:27
"High and Dry Again" (Hagar) - 6:34

Singles
"Serious Juju" b/w "3 in the Middle" US (63985-78160-2)
"Serious Juju" (Radio edit) b/w "Serious Juju" (Album version) US (63985-78160-2)
Live and Raw in Cabo US (BYDJ-78166-2)
Live and Raw in Cabo US (BYDJ-78167-2)
"Let Sally Drive" (Album version) b/w "Let Sally Drive" (Edit) US (BYDJ-78173-2)
"Deeper Kinda Love" (Remix) b/w "Deeper Kinda Love" (Remix edit) US (BYDJ-78174-2)

Versions
Cabo Wabo/Beyond (US): 63985-78110-2
Cabo Wabo/Beyond (Japan): TECI 24043

References

External links
 Lyrics from Hagar's official web site 

Sammy Hagar albums